Mount Tom is a mountain located in Grafton County, New Hampshire, about  southwest of the height of land of Crawford Notch.

The mountain is named after Thomas Crawford, whose family ran three inns in Crawford Notch in the first half of the nineteenth century. Mount Tom is part of the Willey Range of the White Mountains. Tom is flanked to the south by Mount Field. Mt. Tom is drained on the east by Crawford Brook and on the west by the Zealand River. Both are tributaries of the Ammonoosuc River, which drains into the Connecticut and thence into Long Island Sound.

From 1829 until about 1850, Tom Crawford was the innkeeper at the Notch House, which was located at the top of the Notch. Around 1850, Tom Crawford started to build a larger hotel and ran into financial difficulty. Forced to sell out, he left the Notch at that time. The hotel he started became the Crawford House.

An alpine ski area associated with Tom Corcoran and the Crawford House was proposed for the northern slope of the mountain in the early 1970s.

See also

 List of mountains in New Hampshire
 White Mountain National Forest

References

External links
 "Hiking Mount Tom". Appalachian Mountain Club.
 "Mt. Tom". HikeTheWhites.com.
  "Mt. Tom". FranklinSites.com Hiking Guide.
 "Mt. Tom:. New Hampshire Cancelled Ski Areas. NewEnglandSkiHistory.com.

Mountains of New Hampshire
Mountains of Grafton County, New Hampshire
New England Four-thousand footers